France participated in and won the Junior Eurovision Song Contest 2022 in Yerevan, Armenia. French broadcaster France Télévisions is responsible for the country's participation in the contest.

Background 

France debuted in the Junior Eurovision Song Contest 2004 with "" by Thomas Pontier. Despite getting sixth place, France Télévisions decided to withdraw from the contest after 2004, saying there was no motivation to compete and that "too much Eurovision kills Eurovision". In the  contest, Valentina represented France in Warsaw, Poland with the song "". She placed 1st out of 12 entries with 200 points, achieving the first ever French victory at the contest and the first win for France in any Eurovision event since Eurovision Young Dancers 1989. Enzo represented France at the 2021 contest in Paris with the song "Tic Tac", placing third with 187 points.

Before Junior Eurovision
On 28 October 2022, Lissandro Formica was announced as the French entrant at Junior Eurovision 2022 with the song "Oh maman!".

At Junior Eurovision 
After the opening ceremony, which took place on 5 December 2022, it was announced that France would perform sixth on 11 December 2022, following Italy and preceding Albania.

Lissandro Formica went on to win the contest, receiving 203 points.

Voting

Detailed voting results

References 

France
Junior
Junior Eurovision Song Contest